The Chaki are a Muslim community found in the state of Gujarat in India. A small number are also found in the city of Karachi in Pakistan.

History and origin

The Chakee claim to be a clan of the Soomra community of Sindh. According to their traditions, a Soomra prince Chaneeeswar invaded Sindh with the help of Alauddin Khalji to dethrone his younger brother Dodha. Once the Khaljis overthrew Dodha, they expelled many of his supporters, who took refuge in Gujarat. The local rulers in Kutch, Jamnagar and other parts of Saurashtra gave refuge to these Soomra. A few Soomra hid with members of the Lohar and Ghanchi community and came to be known as Chakee. They are distributed mainly in the cities of Bhuj, Mandvi, Mundra and Moghpat in Kutch, as well as the district of Jamnagar. The community speak the Kutchi. In Pakistan, they are found mainly in Chakiwara area of Karachi.

Present Circumstances 

The Chakee speak a dialect of Kutchi with many Sindhi loanwords. There customs are similar to many neighbouring Muslim Maldhari communities, such as the Halaypotra. The Chakee community is divided into fifteen clans, the main ones being the Allahyo, Makkad, Khokhra, Davva, Banani, Lela and Kotuda. These clans are named after the village of occupation or an ancestor. Each clan is of equal status, and intermarry. The community however prefer marrying close kin, and parallel and cross cousin marriages are preferred.

The majority of the Chakee are now agricultural labourers, while a few are involved in plying camel carts. A significant number of the Chakee have immigrated to East Africa and the Gulf States. In addition, a large community exists in Karachi, where the neighbourhood of Chakiwara is a centre of the tribe. Like other Gujarati Muslims, they have a caste association, known as the Chakee Jamat. This acts both as a welfare organization and as an instrument of social control.

See also

Soomra

References 

Sindhi tribes
Social groups of Gujarat
Sindhi tribes in India
Muslim communities of India
Muslim communities of Gujarat